Cláudio Mitsuhiro Kano (18 December 1965 – 1 July 1996) was a Japanese Brazilian table tennis player who helped popularize the sport in Brazil and "spearheaded Brazilian table tennis in the 1990s".

Aged 17, he shared two gold medal, in men's doubles and men's team, at the Pan American Games. He went on to win five more golds, three silvers, and two bronze at later Pan American Games. He died in a motorcycle accident in his native São Paulo, aged 30. He had participated in the Summer Olympic Games of 1988 and 1992, but lost in the first stages of both.

References

External links
 
 

1965 births
1996 deaths
Brazilian male table tennis players
Olympic table tennis players of Brazil
Table tennis players at the 1988 Summer Olympics
Table tennis players at the 1992 Summer Olympics
Pan American Games medalists in table tennis
Pan American Games gold medalists for Brazil
Pan American Games silver medalists for Brazil
Pan American Games bronze medalists for Brazil
Brazilian people of Japanese descent
Sportspeople from São Paulo
Motorcycle road incident deaths
Road incident deaths in Brazil
Table tennis players at the 1983 Pan American Games
Table tennis players at the 1987 Pan American Games
Table tennis players at the 1991 Pan American Games
Table tennis players at the 1995 Pan American Games
Medalists at the 1983 Pan American Games
Medalists at the 1987 Pan American Games
Medalists at the 1991 Pan American Games
Medalists at the 1995 Pan American Games